Makholane is a community council located in the Mafeteng District of Lesotho. Its population in 2006 was 25,002.

Villages
The community of Makholane includes the villages of Ha 'Mpeli, Ha Chopho, Ha Isaka, Ha Joase, Ha Joase (Khohloaneng), Ha Joase (Thabeng), Ha Khalala, Ha Khalienyane, Ha Khalienyane (Mokhoabong), Ha Khati, Ha Koili, Ha Koili (Santeng), Ha Koloboi (Mokhoabong), Ha Koranta, Ha Kotoane, Ha Lebeta, Ha Leemisa, Ha Lempetje (Aupolasi), Ha Lempetje (Ha Malimo), Ha Lesia, Ha Lesole (Mokhoabong), Ha Libete, Ha Likupa, Ha Lumisi, Ha Lumisi (Metheoaneng), Ha Mafeto, Ha Mahali, Ha Maholi, Ha Maholi (Mahlabatheng), Ha Mahosi, Ha Makhathe, Ha Makopela, Ha Malilimetsa, Ha Manehella, Ha Matlatsoaneng, Ha Matšaba, Ha Matsepe, Ha Matsie, Ha Mohapi, Ha Mohlomi, Ha Mokhasi (Mokhoabong), Ha Mokhuthu, Ha Motlohi, Ha Motlohi (Leralleng), Ha Mpata, Ha Nthinya, Ha Ntlhakeng, Ha Ntsiane, Ha Oni, Ha Pelesa, Ha Phokojoe, Ha Qobete, Ha Raborane, Ha Ralerata, Ha Raliemere, Ha Ramaleshoane, Ha Ramarothele, Ha Ramatheko, Ha Ramohapi, Ha Ramokoatsi, Ha Ramontsoe, Ha Ramporoane, Ha Rankapu, Ha Ranthokho, Ha Sebusi, Ha Seetsi, Ha Sekoati, Ha Sempe, Ha Sephula, Ha Setenane, Ha Setenane (Mahloleng), Ha Setenane (Moreneng), Ha Setenane (Motimposo), Ha Tauhali, Ha Teba, Khatleng, Likupa, Liphiring (Ha Ramohapi), Litsahaneng, Litšilong, Maieaneng, Makeneng, Mapolateng, Matlapaneng, Matsooeng, Matsoseng (Ha Lesole), Motse-Mocha, Noka-Ntšo, Qotata, Semakaleng, Thabaneng, Thabaneng (Borokhong), Thabaneng (Maikhokhong), Thabaneng (Sekantšing), Thelingoaneng (Ha Sempe), Thotaneng, Thoteng, Tieleng, Tsaeng and Tsekong.

Health care
The Amitofo Care Centre in Mafeteng was officially opened in 2011.  The organization provides food support and education for vulnerable children.  The 'Makholane Community Council provided land so that the centre would be constructed and is financially sponsored by Amitofo Charity Association.

References

External links
 Google map of community villages
 ACC(Amitofo Care Centre) home page

Populated places in Mafeteng District